Caroline Cannon or Aqugaq is an Iñupiaq leader and environmentalist from Point Hope, Alaska. She was awarded the Goldman Environmental Prize in 2012 for her fight for protection of marine ecosystems against pollution from the petroleum industry.

References

Further reading

Alaska Native activists
American environmentalists
American women environmentalists
Date of birth unknown
Inupiat people
Living people
People from North Slope Borough, Alaska
Goldman Environmental Prize awardees
Year of birth missing (living people)
21st-century American women